The Casketeers is a New Zealand reality television series that was first broadcast 13 Jan 2018 on TVNZ 1, Netflix and SBS. The series follows a New Zealand couple, Francis and Kaiora Tipene, who own and run Tipene Funerals, a funeral parlor with branches in the Auckland suburbs of Onehunga and Henderson, as well as the other funeral directors and assistants employed there.

The series combines humour and pathos by focusing in on families and staff on the stories of individual deaths and bereaved families, the trials and triumphs of running a business, local and traditional funeral and grief practices, and the quirks and relationships of the Tipenes and their staff.

The series features heavy use of Te reo Māori, both in the everyday English narrative and also in the counselling the casketeers provide to their clients. The Māori words spoken by the couple are displayed on screen alongside an English translation.

Season 1 tells the story of the business and the running of the funeral home and the cultural diversity of the practice around the uplifting of the dead through to the final burial an introduction of staff and interviews throughout the episodes.

Season 2 is a follow on of season 1 with many surprises and turns, including the quirkiness of husband and wife and introductions of new staff members and the roles they play and everyday struggles that you would expect Everyday People to have to go through.

Season 3 brings more heartbreak, sadness and love to the Casketeers, focussing on both branches and more staff members an topics that are not talked about also expansion and services that are conducted buy the Casketeers.

Season 4 shows the practices around COVID-19 and the impact on family and cultural diversity and the complications of running the funeral business and the impact on burials and cremation and also the impact on families not being able to have the traditional service according to their heritage and cultural believes due to the impact of COVID-19-throughout 2020.

Season 5 follows after much of the restrictions for COVID-19 have been relaxed, and business returns to normal operation.

Throughout the seasons and episodes we are shown great team building activities and also the casketeers show great love and respect and dignity to those that are no longer living. Also throughout the entire seasons it shows how much compassion, empathy, sympathy, care and respect the Casketeers have for the families. With some laughter and comedy throughout.

Cast
 Francis Tipene, founder and co-owner of Tipene Funeral Homes.
 Kaiora Tipene, Francis's wife and co-owner of Tipene Funeral Homes
 Fatafehi "Fehi" Tamale, funeral director at Tipene Funeral Homes
 Nona Bakulich, funeral director at Tipene Funeral Homes
 Andrew Thompson, funeral director at Tipene Funeral Homes
 Stephanie Samu, funeral director at Tipene Funeral Homes
 Logan Tipene, funeral director at Tipene Funeral Homes
 Vanessa Tamale, receptionist at Tipene Funeral Homes and Fehi's sister-in-law
 Lync Hetaraka, maintenance at Tipene Funeral Homes
 Jay Evans, imbalmer for Tipene Funeral Homes (season 4- )

Development and reception
The series was considered "an unexpected runaway success" in New Zealand. In December 2018, the show was released internationally on Netflix. A second series of the show aired on TVNZ 1 beginning 14 Jan 2019 and was made available for streaming globally on Netflix in 2019.The show's first two seasons were funded by Te Māngai Pāho, a funding body that promotes Māori language and culture. Māori is spoken throughout the series as well as English, and the series credits are listed in both languages.

Episodes

Season 1

Season 2

Season 3

References

External links

The Casketeers on TVNZ On Demand

TVNZ 1 original programming
2018 New Zealand television series debuts
2010s New Zealand television series
New Zealand drama television series
Television series by Seven Productions
Works about Māori people